The discography of Tavito Nanao consists of 6 studio albums and 8 singles, released under major label Sony, before switching to independent label Wonderground Music in 2002 and later Felicity in 2012.

Studio albums

Singles

Featured singles

Promotional singles

Collaborations and produced works

References

Discographies of Japanese artists
Folk music discographies
Pop music discographies
Rock music discographies